Germanium difluoride (GeF2) is a chemical compound of germanium and fluorine. It is a white solid with a melting point of 110 °C, and can be produced by reacting germanium tetrafluoride with germanium powder at 150–300 °C.

Structure
Germanium difluoride forms orthorhombic crystals with a space group P212121 (No. 19), Pearson symbol oP12, and lattice constants a = 0.4682 nm, b = 0.5178 nm, c = 0.8312 nm, Z = 4 (four structure units per unit cell). Its crystal structure is characterized by strong polymeric chains composed by GeF3 pyramids. One of the fluorine atom in the pyramid is shared by two neighboring chains, providing a weak link between them. Another, less common crystal form of GeF2 has tetragonal symmetry with a space group P41212 (No. 92), Pearson symbol tP12, and lattice constants a = 0.487 nm, b = 0.6963 nm, c = 0.858 nm.

References

Fluorides
Metal halides
Germanium(II) compounds